Charaxes overlaeti is a butterfly in the family Nymphalidae. It is found in the Democratic Republic of the Congo and Kenya.

Taxonomy
Known only from the holotype and a similar specimen captured in Kenya.
Charaxes overlaeti  may be a hybrid between Charaxes bohemani and Charaxes ameliae. 

Charaxes tiridates group.

The supposed clade members are:
Charaxes tiridates
Charaxes numenes, similar to next
Charaxes bipunctatus, similar to last
Charaxes violetta
Charaxes fuscus
Charaxes mixtus
Charaxes bubastis
Charaxes albimaculatus
Charaxes barnsi
Charaxes bohemani
Charaxes schoutedeni
Charaxes monteiri
Charaxes smaragdalis
Charaxes xiphares
Charaxes cithaeron
Charaxes nandina
Charaxes imperialis
Charaxes ameliae
Charaxes pythodoris
? Charaxes overlaeti
For a full list see Eric Vingerhoedt, 2013.

References

External links
Images of C. overlaeti Royal Museum for Central Africa (Albertine Rift Project)
Charaxes overlaeti images Holotype

Butterflies described in 1934
overlaeti
Taxa named by Henri Schouteden